Mírová pod Kozákovem is a municipality in Semily District in the Liberec Region of the Czech Republic. It has about 1,700 inhabitants.

Administrative parts
The municipality consists of villages of Bělá, Bukovina, Chloumek, Chutnovka, Dubecko, Hrachovice, Kvítkovice, Loktuše, Prackov, Rohliny, Sekerkovy Loučky, Smrčí, Stebno, and Vesec.

Geography

The Stebenka stream flows across the municipality. It lies in a hilly landscape of the Jičín Uplands, the eastern part of the municipality is crossed by the Ještěd–Kozákov Ridge.

History
The first written mention of settlements in the area of Mírová pod Kozákovem is from 1230. Mírová pod Kozákovem was established in 1960 by the merger of the municipalities of Vesec (including Smrčí and Prackov), Loktuše, Sekerkovy Loučky (including Chutnovka, Dubecko, Hrachovice, Kvítkovice, and Stebno) and Bělá (including Bukovina, Chloumek, and Rohliny). The municipal office is located in Chutnovka.

Education
There are two schools in Mírová pod Kozákovem, a kindergarten in Chutnovka and a primary school (1st–5th grade) in Bělá. The municipality founds both schools.

Sights
There are two notable sights in the municipality. The viewing platform is located at a height .

In Bukovina, there are ruins of Rotštejn Castle. This Gothic castle was founded around 1250. It was a building partly brick and partly carved into a block of four sandstone rocks. In 1514, it was listed as desolate. The destruction of the castle was probably caused by the natural weathering of sandstone rocks and the subsequent decline of the terrain.

References

External links

 

Villages in Semily District